Fade to Black can refer to:

 Fade (lighting), in stage lighting, a change in light level; decreasing the level to complete darkness is a "fade to black"
 Fade to Black (novel), a Nero Wolfe mystery by Robert Goldsborough
 Fade to Black (video game), a 1995 sequel to Flashback

Film
 Fade to Black (1980 film), slasher flick starring Dennis Christopher
 Fade to Black (1993 film), made-for-TV thriller starring Heather Locklear
 Fade to Black (2004 film), documentary about rapper Jay-Z
 Fade to Black (2006 film), starring Danny Huston as Orson Welles
 Bleach: Fade to Black (2008 film)

Music
Fade to Black, album by Cookie Crew 1991
 Fade to Black: Memories of Johnny, an album by Tommy Cash, or the title song
 "Fade to Black" (Metallica song), 1984
 Fade to Black (Nadir Rustamli song), 2022
 "Fade to Black", a song by Dire Straits from On Every Street
 "Fade to Black", a song by Apoptygma Berzerk